John Dean (born 16 April 1956) is a former Australian rules footballer who played with South Melbourne in the Victorian Football League (VFL).

Notes

External links 

Living people
1956 births
Australian rules footballers from Victoria (Australia)
Sydney Swans players
Spotswood Football Club players